This is a list in both Italian and Friulian language of place names in the historical area of Friuli, Italy, with the official spelling standard published by ARLeF - Regional Agency for the Friulian Language in 2009.  Grave accents ( ` ) on the Friulian forms are to show syllable stress but are rarely written except when placed on the ultimate syllable.  Italics are used for the names of municipalities that are not included within the area subject to protection of the Friulian language minority. These names are divided according to the former Italian province in which they lay.  From the historical point of view, both the Italian and Friulian forms are found in medieval documents. In some cases, though, Italian names were created by the fascist regime to Italianise the region.

Municipalities in the province of Gorizia

Municipalities in the province of Pordenone

Municipalities in the province of Udine

Municipalities in the province of Belluno 
One comune (municipality) in the Province of Belluno, Sappada, was historically part of Friuli. In 2010, the comune formally asked to become part of Friuli-Venezia Giulia and the Regional Council of Friuli-Venezia Giulia accepted the municipality's demand.  Other comuni in the Province of Belluno are listed in the Friulian place names outside of Friuli section below.

Municipalities in the Metropolitan City of Venice 
The Friulian names of these comuni are listed here. Other comuni in the Province of Venice are listed in the Friulian place names outside of Friuli section below. It is estimated that 29% of the population in these areas speaks fluent Friuli. The language is officially recognized and has been protected as a minority language since 2006.

Friulian place names outside of Friuli

Italy

Comuni in the Province of Trieste
Following is a list of all comuni (municipalities) in the Province of Trieste.  Although part of the region of Friuli-Venezia Giulia, the province is not part of Friuli proper.

Comuni in the Veneto
Following is a list of select comuni (municipalities) bearing Friulian-language names in the Italian region of Veneto which borders Friuli.  Note that comuni in the historically Friulian area of the Mandamento of Portogruaro are listed above in the Municipalities in the Metropolitan City of Venice section.

Austria

Carinthia
Following is a list of cities, municipalities, and other settlements bearing Friulian-language names in the Austrian federal state of Carinthia which borders Friuli.

References

Friuli
Friuli
Friulian language
Friulian